Middop is a rural hamlet and civil parish in Lancashire, England. It is in Ribble Valley district. In the 2001 United Kingdom census, Middop had a population of 43. Owing to the limited population from the 2011 Census details are included in the parish of Rimington.

The parish adjoins the Ribble Valley parish of Rimington the Pendle parishes of Blacko and Bracewell and Brogden.

Middop has four Grade II listed buildings and structures, Middop Hall, Newfield Edge Hall, a boundary stone and a milestone.

Middop was once a township in the ancient parish of Gisburn, in the Staincliffe Wapentake of the West Riding of Yorkshire. This became a civil parish in 1866, forming part of the Bowland Rural District from 1894 to 1974. It has since become part of the Lancashire borough of Ribble Valley. It shares its parish council with Rimington.

Along with Rimington, Gisburn, Gisburn Forest, Paythorne, Newsholme and Horton, the parish forms the Gisburn, Rimington ward of Ribble Valley Borough Council.

Media gallery

See also

Listed buildings in Middop

References

Civil parishes in Lancashire
Geography of Ribble Valley